Caio César Zanardi Gomes da Silva (born 8 August 1973) is a Brazilian football manager who manages Khor Fakkan.

Career

In 2006, Zanardi was appointed manager of Lithuanian side Vilnius. In 2013, he was appointed manager of Brazil U17, helping them win the 2015 South American U-17 Championship. In 2015, he was appointed manager of Fort Lauderdale Strikers in the United States.  In 2017, Zanardi was appointed manager of Brazilian club Desportivo Brasil. In 2018, he was appointed manager of Al Nasr (Dubai) in the United Arab Emirates. In 2020, he was appointed technical director of Portuguese team Oliveirense. In 2020, Zanardi was appointed manager of Khor Fakkan in the United Arab Emirates.

Personal life
Zanardi's younger brother Márcio is also a football manager.

References

External links

Brazilian people of Italian descent
Brazilian football managers
Living people
Expatriate soccer managers in the United States
1973 births
North American Soccer League coaches
Fort Lauderdale Strikers coaches
Al-Nasr SC (Dubai) managers
UAE Pro League managers
Brazilian expatriate sportspeople in the United Arab Emirates
Brazilian expatriate football managers
Brazilian expatriate sportspeople in Lithuania
Expatriate football managers in the United Arab Emirates
Expatriate football managers in Lithuania
Brazilian expatriate sportspeople in the United States